The Gendarmerie Search and Rescue Battalion Command (Turkish: Jandarma Arama Kurtarma Tabur Komutanlığı) or shortly as JAK, is the Search and rescue unit of the Gendarmerie General Command in Turkey. It has several missions which all kinds of natural and man-made disasters that may occur inside of domestic and abroad places with in mountains, caves, canyons, underwater to conduct search and rescue operations with, was established on 1 September 1999 in Ankara under the command of the Gendarmerie Commando Special Public Order.

To perform these tasks; Within the JAK Battalion Command, there is a Special Search and Rescue Company consisting of Disaster Search and Rescue Companies and Mountaineering, Underwater and Dog Search and Rescue Teams.

Training Activities 

 Earthquake Search and Rescue Training.
 Avalanche Search and Rescue Training.
 CBRN Training.
 Flood Search and Rescue Training.
 Fire Search and Rescue Training.
 Mountaineering Education.
 Underwater Training.
 Search and rescue dog Team Training.
 Skiing Training.
 Snowmobiling and over-snow vehicle Training.
 First aid Training.

Departments 
JAK Battalion Command; has three Disaster Search and Rescue and one Special Search and Rescue Company (CBRN defense).  Also thirteen Underwater Search and rescue Teams, twenty-three Mountaineering Rescue Teams and five Gendarmerie Search and rescue dog Team.

See also 
 Combat Search and Rescue (Turkish Armed Forces)
 Diving, Safety, Security, Search and Rescue Team of Coast Guard Command (Turkey) ( This unit applies to the seas) JAK Underwater Search and rescue team isfor inland waters.
 Air Force Search and Rescue Turkey
 Disaster and Emergency Management Presidency Turkey

References

Gendarmerie (Turkey)